Charles Assemekang (born June 16, 1926 in Souanké) was a Congolese politician. He was educated at the Institut des hautes études d'Outre-Mer and obtained a doctorate in Law. He became president of the Supreme Court of the Republic of the Congo. In 1969 he was named Minister of Foreign Affairs. He was also a Central Committee member of the Congolese Party of Labour. In December 1971 his political career was cut short, as he was expelled from the party for 'occult practices'.

References

Foreign Ministers of the Republic of the Congo
Government ministers of the Republic of the Congo
Congolese Party of Labour politicians
1926 births
1991 deaths